Anthony Patrick Hudson (born March 11, 1981) is an English-American professional association football manager who is currently serving as the interim head coach of the United States national team.

Hudson became one of the youngest coaches to earn the UEFA Pro Licence, the highest coaching award in football, in 2012. Hudson has managed two international teams, and won two international tournaments, qualifying for the 2015 AFC Asian Cup and 2017 FIFA Confederations Cup in the process. Hudson also became the youngest ever manager to lead a team in FIFA Confederations Cup history.

Playing career
Hudson started playing in the youth system at Premier League club West Ham United, before being loaned to Luton Town. After being released by West Ham, Hudson signed a two-year deal with Dutch First Division team NEC Nijmegen. After six months, however, he asked to be released and returned home to England. He then moved to American lower division club Wilmington Hammerheads in 2006, ultimately appearing in 10 league games.

Coaching career

United Soccer League
In 2005, Hudson became player-assistant head coach of USL Second Division team Wilmington Hammerheads, having spent the previous two years working as an academy coach at AC Diablos SC.

On October 28, 2008, Hudson was named as Real Maryland Monarchs head coach at the age of 27. He was the youngest professional manager (head coach) in the U.S at the time. In his first season as manager he led the club, which had finished bottom of the table in 2008, to fifth place and a Playoffs spot, their first visit to the post-season. Real Maryland were knocked out in the quarter-final after a 3–1 defeat by the Charlotte Eagles. Hudson was also nominated for the USL Second Division 2009 Coach of the Year Award.

In the 2010 USL Second Division, Real Maryland finished last, having not won in their final ten games of the season. After overcoming Reading United in the first round of the 2010 US Open Cup, Real Maryland were knocked out in the second round by the Richmond Kickers. Hudson left Real Maryland at the conclusion of the 2010 season after two seasons in charge.

Tottenham Hotspur
After leaving Real Maryland following the 2010 season, Hudson returned to the United Kingdom to take up a post coaching Tottenham Hotspur's reserves.

Newport County
In April 2011, Hudson, aged 30, was appointed manager of Conference Premier club Newport County with seven games remaining of their 2010–11 season. He arrived with a "glittering reference" from Harry Redknapp, who likened him to "a young José Mourinho".

Hudson took charge of Newport County for the first time in a 2–1 home victory over Darlington. A further three wins and two losses followed as Newport County finished ninth in the 2010–11 Conference Premier. In July 2011, Hudson was working towards the UEFA Pro Licence with the English Football Association. On September 28, 2011, with Newport having won only once in their first 12 games, Hudson was sacked, despite new signing David Pipe stating "we've lost quite a few games lately but everyone is definitely behind the gaffer", and senior players "contacting the press to let the fans know what the players think". Following Hudson's departure, Newport Chairman Chris Blight was quoted as saying "We are a quarter of the way through the season and to be where we are, to Newport County Football Club is not what we expected or anticipated."

Bahrain

On March 21, 2012, Hudson was appointed manager of the Bahrain under-23 team. He was brought in to coach the national under-23 and Olympic team by Peter Taylor, national team coach of Bahrain senior team. Hudson led Bahrain under-23 to the final of the 2012 U23 Gulf Cup, eventually losing 2–0 to Saudi Arabia under-23. Hudson then worked under Argentinian coach Gabriel Calderón after Taylor's sacking on October 17, 2012. Hudson signed a two-year extension as the Bahrain under-23 manager in June.

On August 13, 2013, Hudson was appointed manager of Bahrain, succeeding Calderón. Hudson first took charge of Bahrain in a 2–1 friendly loss to Kuwait in September followed by wins over Malaysia and Yemen in November, which secured Bahrain qualification for the 2015 Asian Cup. Hudson was listed as a potential candidate as coach of Denmark in October. Hudson led the Bahrain U23 team to their first title at the U23 Gulf Cup of Nations, beating Saudi Arabia in the final. This was the first official gold medal the Bahrain U23 national team have won in their history.

In January 2014, Hudson led Bahrain to a third-place finish at the 2014 WAFF Championship. After 0–0 draws against Oman and Iraq, Bahrain made the semi-finals of the tournament due to a drawing of lots. Bahrain lost their semifinal 1–0 to Jordan, and earned their third-place finish via a penalty shootout after 0–0 draw against Kuwait. In February 2014, Hudson signed a two-year contract extension as Bahrain manager. On July 27, 2014, Hudson resigned as manager of Bahrain.

New Zealand All Whites
In August 2014, Hudson was appointed manager of the New Zealand national football team. After resigning from his position with Bahrain, Hudson moved to New Zealand for the full-time role which also includes responsibilities in overseeing the programme of the country's age-group representative sides. Both New Zealand national under-20 football team and New Zealand national under-17 football team made history by making into knockout stages of their respective World Cups in the same cycle for the first time. Hudson's first game in charge of the national team was a 3–1 defeat away to Uzbekistan in September 2014.

In 2015, All Whites defeated Oman in a 1–0 victory. Hudson also took the coaching reins of the New Zealand U23 who won all three of their pool games and their semi final without conceding a goal in their Oceania Olympic Qualifiers at the Pacific Games in July 2015, but were disqualified (and had their semi final win overturned) for fielding an ineligible player due to an administrative error from the national body. This incident led to Hudson losing players for selection for his preparation for his matches against Myanmar and Oman as the national body continued their detailed review of the internal processes and eligibility information for all players.

In January 2016, Hudson hit out on the national body over lack of games as the national body failed to find a fixture against suitable opposition for the All Whites in the March FIFA window. Hudson's squad assembled for the first time for the year in May, for a two-week training camp in Australia, ahead of the 2016 OFC Nations Cup hosted in Papua New Guinea. Despite having to change the team due to national body's "administrative error" losing players who were no longer eligible, as well as a lack of matches organised from the national body, the All Whites won the 2016 OFC Nations Cup, winning four matches with the final being won via a penalty shootout after a 0–0 draw against Papua New Guinea, conceding one goal throughout the competition, from a penalty, in the process. New Zealand's victory saw them crowned Oceania champions making New Zealand the most successful national team in the competition's history, having won the tournament five times, and also saw them qualify for the 2017 FIFA Confederations Cup in Russia. In September 2016, Hudson appointed former Hull City, Crystal Palace, Leicester City, England Under-21 and stand-in England manager Peter Taylor as his assistant coach. When appointed Peter Taylor praised the progress made by the All Whites under Hudson.

In October 2016, after two away games against Mexico and USA (a 2–1 loss and a 1–1 draw, respectively), former All Whites' captain Ryan Nelsen said the team had gone up a level under Hudson and he had "never seen New Zealand teams play this way". Hudson was also linked to the manager's position at Derby County and Norwich City and reportedly turned down job for MK Dons. Hudson denied that he was approached by Derby County, stating there had been "no approach or contact between him and Derby".

In March 2017, Hudson led the All Whites into the Round 3 Play-Off Final by securing top spot in Group A of the third stage of Oceania World Cup Qualifiers. During the All Whites' preparation for World Cup Qualifiers against Fiji, Tommy Smith, senior player, praised the professionalism of the national team's set-up. Hudson made an inaccurate statement regarding the statistics of the All Whites records. Hudson's statement, "losing one game in two years" and "scoring 26 goals, conceding 5", was in fact including the New Zealand U23's record, games he has coached in his campaign for New Zealand, and taking the All Whites' two-year run from after their March 31, 2015, match against South Korea.

In June 2016, Hudson led the All Whites to 2017 FIFA Confederations Cup as the lowest ranked team, 95th at the time, in the tournament. Their first match was against the hosts Russia, where they were beaten 0–2. Their second match against Mexico was a close one as they took the lead, but their efforts ended in a 1–2 loss, thus earning their early exit along with Russia. Despite the exit, Portugal's manager, Fernando Santos, praised New Zealand as a "team that can surprise anyone" after their performances against Mexico. In the end, New Zealand finished Group A with a third defeat to European champions Portugal. In spite of this, Hudson was praised from overseas press, including Portugal and South Korea as well as from New Zealand captain Winston Reid, and player Ryan Thomas for constant "improvements" of the trainings and the environment.

In September 2017, New Zealand won the OFC Final against Solomon Islands. The All Whites won the home-and-away tie on an aggregate score of 8–3 to win the OFC Qualifiers and qualify for the Inter-continental play-offs qualifier against the fifth-ranked nation from South America, Peru. This match represented New Zealand's first home match to be played against a "top-100 nation" in the last three and a half years, unprecedented for any international team.

In November 2017, Hudson took his team into two-legged intercontinental playoff against Peru, world's 10th ranked team at the time, for a place at the 2018 FIFA World Cup in Russia. After a 0–0 draw in Wellington, Peru beat New Zealand 2–0 in Lima, qualifying for the World Cup on aggregate over the two legs. Hudson later announced his resignation as All Whites coach after not qualifying for the World Cup, despite a desire from NZ Football chief executive Andy Martin for him to stay. Following Hudson's departure, Martin described Hudson as one of the best coaches NZF has had and he would leave behind a professional standard that NZF had never had before.

As part of a High Performance Sport NZ programme, Hudson also spent time with All Blacks' coaches, Steve Hansen and long-time assistant Wayne Smith, as well as Crusaders coach Scott Robertson. Hudson has close relationship with Hansen as All Blacks previously shared time with him and the All Whites.

Colorado Rapids
On November 29, 2017, Hudson was announced as the new coach of the Colorado Rapids in Major League Soccer. At 36, Hudson became the youngest head coach in Colorado Rapids' history, as well as the youngest head coach in the 2018 MLS season. In his first season in charge, Hudson led the Rapids to nine consecutive losses across all competitions, including a loss to lower division United Soccer League side Nashville SC in the U.S. Open Cup.

On May 1, 2019, the Rapids announced that they had relieved Hudson of his duties following comments made in the media post the Atlanta United game where he was quoted,

Hudson's comments were related to his team being the only team in the league with one marquee player, goalkeeper Tim Howard, whereas other teams had two or three marquee players.

After Hudson was relieved of his duties, the Rapids named assistant coach Conor Casey as his interim replacement. Hudson ended his tenure in Denver with an 8–26–9 record as the statistical worst coach in Rapids history at the time.

United States
On January 4, 2023, Hudson was named interim manager of the United States national team, following the expiration of previous manager Gregg Berhalter's contract with U.S. Soccer. In a press release, the federation announced that Hudson would be responsible for selecting and managing the roster for the January 2023 camp and associated friendlies against Serbia and Colombia.

During his interim management of the USMNT, he was also targeted by Iran and Oman to become coach of one of these national teams.

Personal life
Hudson is the son of former Chelsea, Stoke City, Arsenal professional player and England international Alan Hudson. He was born in Seattle during his father's stint with the Seattle Sounders and raised in England. He attended Millfield School. Apart from his native English, Hudson also speaks Spanish.

During the end of his football career and the start of his management career, Hudson sought out help from Alcoholics Anonymous which aided him to quit in 2005. Hudson has been sober since and has volunteered in prisons and hospitals in the US, UK, and New Zealand, helping people with drinking problems.

Managerial statistics

Managerial achievements
Real Marylands
 2009 United Soccer Leagues Play-offs

Bahrain
 2014 WAFF Championship bronze medal
 Qualification for AFC Asian Cup 2015 in Australia

Bahrain U-23
 Gulf Cup of Nations Under 23: 2013 champions
 Gulf Cup of Nations Under 23: 2012 runners-up

New Zealand
 OFC Nations Cup: 2016 champions
 Qualification for FIFA Confederations Cup 2017 in Russia
 2018 FIFA World Cup qualification OFC Finals winner

References

1981 births
Living people
American soccer players
English footballers
Association football midfielders
West Ham United F.C. players
Luton Town F.C. players
NEC Nijmegen players
Wilmington Hammerheads FC players
American soccer coaches
English football managers
Newport County A.F.C. managers
Bahrain national football team managers
National League (English football) managers
New Zealand national football team managers
Soccer players from Seattle
USL Second Division players
2017 FIFA Confederations Cup managers
English expatriate sportspeople in the United States
Expatriate soccer players in the United States
English expatriate footballers
Expatriate soccer managers in the United States
English expatriate football managers
Colorado Rapids coaches
Major League Soccer coaches
English expatriate sportspeople in the Netherlands
Expatriate footballers in the Netherlands
Real Maryland F.C.
USL League Two coaches
English expatriate sportspeople in Bahrain
Expatriate football managers in Bahrain
English expatriate sportspeople in New Zealand
Expatriate association football managers in New Zealand
People educated at Millfield